Garsenda I of Forcalquier (died before 1193) was the daughter of William of Urgell, wife of Rainou of Sabran, and mother of Garsenda II, Countess of Forcalquier Her mother was Adelaide of Beziers, daughter of Raymond I Trencavel, Viscount of Agde and Béziers.

It is noted in historical documentation that from 1144 to 1152, Garsenda was involved in a land dispute with the church (opposition lead by Guillame de Bévévent, Archbishop of Embrun[fr]) regarding transfer of ownership of edifices in Manosque and Toute Aures. Garsenda, along with other nobility, sought to keep the land within her family following the death of her uncle Bertrand II. It was ruled by the courts that the castles would be shared among the monks and counts of the municipality, with her mother's family making a donation to the monastery.

References

Sources

French nobility
French royalty
Women of medieval France
12th-century French women

12th-century deaths
Year of birth unknown

Year of death unknown